Sandy Records was a short-lived but very influential independent rock and roll record label established in Mobile, Alabama by Paul DuBose and Johnny Bozeman in early 1957.  It launched the careers of many artists such as Ray Sawyer, lead vocalist of Dr. Hook and the Medicine Show.

Artist
Helen Bozeman
Johnny Bozeman
Ken Bozeman
Curtis Bunyard
Johnny Foster
Ronny Keenan
Jackie Morningstar
Travis Pritchett
George Richardson
Ray Sawyer
Morris Simmons
Travis & Bob
Darryl Vincent
Happy Wainwright
Buddy Walker
Bob Weaver
Floyd Whitehurst

Subsidiary labels
Shane Records
Orange Records

See also
 List of record labels

References
 45 Discography for Sandy Records

Record labels established in 1957
Defunct record labels of the United States
Rock and roll record labels